Thomas Rodger (9 June 1882 – after 1908) was a Scottish professional footballer who played as a winger in the Football League for Preston North End, Grimsby Town and Leeds City. He also played in the Southern League for Brighton & Hove Albion.

References

1882 births
Footballers from Dundee
Scottish footballers
Association football wingers
Dundee F.C. players
Manchester United F.C. players
Preston North End F.C. players
Grimsby Town F.C. players
Reading F.C. players
Brighton & Hove Albion F.C. players
Leeds City F.C. players
English Football League players
Southern Football League players
Year of death missing